Girish A.D. is an Indian film Director/Screenplay, who has worked predominantly in Malayalam movie industry. Girish A.D. has worked in popular movies like Super Sharanya, Thanneer Mathan Dinangal.

Early and personal life 
Girish A.D. was born in Aluva, Kerala, to Dineshan and Geetha. He attended his higher secondary in St. Sebastians HSS, Kuttikkad. He did his Bachelor of Technology in METS School of Engineering, Mala. Girish is married to Chippy Viswan since 23 June 2019.

Career 
After graduating, Girish started making short films. Yashpal, Vishuddha Ambrose and Mookutthi were his early works, all of which got critical acclaim and viewership. He bagged the best Director Award in Adoor short film festival 2017 for Vishuddha Ambrose.

After briefly appearing in Bilahari K Raj's 2017 independent film 'Porattam', Girish debuted as a writer in Malayalam film industry in 2018 with Allu Ramendran directed by Bilahari K Raj. The following year, he made his directorial debut with Thanneer Mathan Dinangal (transl. Watermelon Days). The film being a coming-of age romantic comedy co-written by Dinoy Poulose, was jointly produced by Plan J Studios and Shebin Backer Productions. It starred Vineeth Sreenivasan, Mathew Thomas, and Anaswara Rajan in the lead roles. In 2022, Girish's second directorial Super Sharanya got released.

Filmography

Short films

References 

Malayalam film directors
Film directors from Kochi
Malayalam screenwriters
Indian male actors
Living people
Year of birth missing (living people)